Olga Govortsova and Mandy Minella were the defending champions but chose not to participate.

Quinn Gleason and Tereza Mihalíková won the title, defeating Emina Bektas and Tara Moore in the final, 7–6(7–5), 7–5.

Seeds

Draw

Draw

References
Main Draw

Henderson Tennis Open - Doubles